Groendal Dam is an arch-type dam located on the Zwartskop River, near Uitenhage, Eastern Cape, South Africa. The Dam was constructed  in 1933 (commissioned in 1934) and its primary purpose is for municipal and domestic use. The hazard potential of the dam has been ranked high (3).

See also

List of reservoirs and dams in South Africa
List of rivers of South Africa

References 
 List of South African Dams from the Department of Water Affairs and Forestry (South Africa)

Dams in South Africa
Dams completed in 1934
1934 establishments in South Africa